Lai Châu is a province in the Northwest region of Vietnam. Lai Châu province is one of the most sparsely populated regions in Vietnam, and it shares a border with China. It was once a semi-independent White Tai confederation known as Sip Song Chau Tai, but was absorbed by France into French Indochina in the 1880s and subsequently became part of Vietnam following Vietnamese independence in 1954. It became part of the Northwest Autonomous Area of the Democratic Republic of Vietnam from 1955 to 1975, when Lai Châu province was formed. Điện Biên province was carved out of Lai Châu in 2004. The province covers an area of 9068.79 square kilometres and as of 2019 it had a population of 460,196 people.

Etymology 
Sip Song Chau Tai is a Tai Lü compound consisting of sibsong "twelve" and chu "master". It is a cognate to Thai สิบสองจุไท, and may be translated in English as "Twelve Tai Kingdoms" or "Chiefdoms", according to relative standing in the Southeast Asian mandala political model, in allusion to either a Chief of the Name or a tribal chief. Sibsong derives from Chinese 十 (ten) and 雙 (pair). "Chu" (rendered in Tai as จุ or in the longer form เจ้า,) derives from Middle Chinese 主 (ćǘ) "master."

Demographics
As of April 1, 2019, Lai Châu's population was 460,196 people, ranked 62/63 provinces and municipalities nationwide, above Bắc Kạn province. 17,8% of the population lived in urban areas while 82,2% lived in rural areas.Thai people: 131.822 người (34%), Kinh people: 73,233 people, accounting for 15.9% of the population, the rest are of the other ethnic groups: Hmong, Hani, Dao... This is also the least populous province in the Northwest with nearly 500,000 people.

Languages (apart from Vietnamese language) spoken in Lai Châu province include the following:
Hmong–Mien languages
Hmong
Iu Mien
Tai languages
Black Tai
White Tai
Tai Lü (Phong Tho, Sin Ho)
Giáy
Lao (Phong Tho, Than Uyen)
Thai
Kra languages
Laha (Than Uyên)
Tibeto-Burman languages
Sila (Mường Tè)
Côông (Mường Tè)
Lahu (Mường Tè)
Lisu (Mường Tè)
Hani (Mường Tè, Phong Thổ)
Akha (Mường Tè, Phong Thổ)
Hao-Bai (Mường Tè, Phong Thổ)
Austroasiatic languages
Kháng (Mường Tè, Phong Thổ, Than Uyên)
Khmu (Mường Tè, Phong Thổ, Than Uyên)

Economy 

Lai Châu has long been the poorest province in Vietnam. It is also the least industrialised province. In 1974, the industrial output of Hanoi - the richest province in North Vietnam at that time - was 47 times as high as that of Lai Châu.  The province became even more backward after the more industrialised south was separated to become Điện Biên province. In 2007, Hanoi's industrial output (before its merger with Hà Tây province) was 93 times that of Lai Châu. Industrial output has, however, grown rapidly in recent years, more than tripling between 2000 and 2007, making the fastest growing sector in the province compared to an agriculture and forestry sector that has grown by less than 50% and a service sector that has more than doubled in the same time.  Industrial products include liquor, bricks, cement and electricity. Industrial output in 2007 was 476.6 billion Vietnamese đồngs, accounting for 28.9% of the province's economy, compared to only 16.5% in 2000.

Lai Châu's main agricultural products (in 2007) are rice (99,900 t), maize (35,000 t), cassava (48,900 t) and tea (16,532 t). The production of rice and maize has tripled since 2000, while the output of cassava and tea has been increasing by around 40% and 120% respectively. Tea from Lai Châu is sold to other provinces in Vietnam and also exported to other countries.

Lai Châu has a relatively large forestry sector with an output of 176.3 billion đồngs in 2007. It has, however, been far overtaken by the agricultural, industrial and service sectors and contributed little to recent growth. It has grown by only 1.69% in 2006 and 1.66% in 2007, after declining by almost 19% between 2000 and 2005.

There are plans to exploit rare-earth elements in Lai Châu.
Vietnam's central government signed an agreement in October 2010 to supply Japan with rare-earth elements from Lai Châu province. This is part of Japan's efforts to diversify its supply of rare earths and decrease its dependence on imports from China.

Lai Châu's economy grew by 50.75% between 2000 and 2005, 12.3% in 2006 and 14.56% in 2007.

Administrative divisions 

Lai Châu is subdivided into eight district-level sub-divisions and 106 commune-level sub-divisions:

Infrastructure

Transport 
National Road 4 connects Lai Châu to Lào Cai province, National Road 12 to Điện Biên province and National Road 32 to Yên Bái province. There is also a road to Gejiu in China. There is neither an airport nor a railway in the province.

Road transport has grown rapidly in recent years. Freight traffic increased from 1 million ton-km in 2000 to 21.3 million ton-km in 2007, while passenger traffic increased from 4.4 to 16.7 million passenger-km.

Road infrastructure is still not very developed. Only 19.36% of the roads in the province are paved and only 10.53% of respondents to a survey of local businesses think that road quality is good or very good.

Telecommunication 
As of 2007, there 22,100 telephone subscribers in Lai Châu, a significant increase from the 14,200 in the previous year. Only 35.59% of the respondents to a survey assessed telecommunications quality as good or very good, the lowest value among all the provinces in Vietnam.

Climate 
Annual average temperature: 23 degrees Celsius
Annual average rainfall: 2.5 m

References

External links 
 

 
Northwest (Vietnam)
Hani people
Provinces of Vietnam